Mark Schultz is the self-titled debut album released by Contemporary Christian music artist Mark Schultz. It was released on March 28, 2000.

Track listing 
All songs written by Mark Schultz.
 "I Am the Way" – 3:58
 "Let's Go" – 2:26
 "He's My Son" – 5:40
 "When You Come Home" – 4:57
 "When You Give" – 4:34
 "Fall in Love Again" – 4:03
 "Cloud of Witnesses" – 4:39
 "Learn to Let Go" – 4:32
 "I Saw the Light" – 3:42
 "Legend of McBride" – 4:29
 "Remember Me" (with Ginny Owens) – 4:07

Personnel 
 Mark Schultz – lead and backing vocals, acoustic piano 
 Jeff Roach – keyboards, acoustic piano
 Gary Burnette – electric guitar 
 George Cocchini – acoustic guitar, electric guitar 
 Rivers Rutherford – acoustic guitar
 Mark Hill – bass
 Greg Herrington – drums
 Dan Needham – drums
 Mark Douthit – horns
 Mike Haynes – horns
 Lisa Cochran – backing vocals
 Tabitha Fair – backing vocals
 Kim Keyes – backing vocals
 Marilyn Martin – backing vocals 
 Michael Mellett – backing vocals 
 Peter Penrose – backing vocals 
 Chris Rodriguez – backing vocals 
 Ginny Owens – backing vocals (11)

Production 
 Producer – Monroe Jones
 Executive Producer – Dan Posthuma
 Recorded by Richie Biggs and Jim Dineen
 Assistant Engineer – Rob Evans 
 Recorded at Dark Horse Recording Studio (Franklin, TN).
 Mixed by Shane Wilson at Whistler‘s Music (Nashville, TN), assisted by Scott Bilyeu.
 Mastered by Stephen Marcussen at Marcussen Mastering (Hollywood, CA).
 Management – Creative Trust

Reception

Critical reception 
Allmusic gave the album mixed reviews. "In a way, this is the contrast Michael W. Smith has built his career upon, but Schultz has a little more of a rock piano and gospel influence, and actually a more appealing voice. The most interesting production is "When You Give," which finds Schultz (who also plays keyboards) backed by a gospel choir that breaks into the R&B chestnut "Take Me To the River" and gives those lyrics a spiritual meaning. After this, more pedestrian tunes like "Fall in Love Again" are a bit of a letdown, but on their own, each of the songs here holds up and works on both personal and more universal levels. Schultz's songs cover a wide range of topics, from learning to see God from a blind man's perspective to the pain of letting go when a child finally grows up."

Positive reception 
Music listeners welcomed Mark Schultz's debut album and Billboard reported on August 12, 2000 the album was number 22 on Billboard's Top Contemporary Christian chart with outstanding songs He's My Son, Cloud of Witnesses, and Remember Me.

Singles

References 

Mark Schultz (musician) albums
2000 albums